"Fragile", released with a B-side track "Jirenma", is a single by the J-pop group Every Little Thing, released as their eighteenth single on January 1, 2001. It was their fourth single to top the Oricon chart.

"Fragile" is the theme music of Fuji Television's Ainori, broadcast between October 2000 and September 2001. It is also the theme music of original video animation Fragtime, an anime adaption produced by Tear Studio and based on the manga of the same title. It was also used as the fourth insert song for the romance anime Tsuki ga Kirei (2017), covered by Nao Tōyama. Its cover version by Rie Takahashi was used as the third ending theme music for Teasing Master Takagi-san: The Movie (2022). "Jirenma" was used as the ending theme song for Initial D Third Stage.

Track listing
 Fragile (Words - Kaori Mochida / music - Kazuhito Kikuchi)
 Jirenma (Words - Kaori Mochida / music - Ichiro Ito)
 Jirenma (FPM Young Soul mix)
 Fragile (instrumental)
 Jirenma (instrumental)

Chart positions

Remixes
"White Roses Remix" by Laurent Newfield : Super Eurobeat Presents Euro Every Little Thing
"Eurobeat Mix" by Laurent Newfield : J-Euro Non-Stop Best

References

External links
 "Fragile/Jirenma" information at Avex Network.
 "Fragile/Jirenma" information at Oricon.

2001 singles
Every Little Thing (band) songs
Oricon Weekly number-one singles
Songs written by Kaori Mochida
Japanese film songs
Songs written for animated films
Avex Trax singles